There are a variety of community groups in the neighbourhood of Regent Park, Toronto, Ontario, which have been highly active in promoting a positive sense of community and community representation, and in pursuing a higher quality of life.

 416 Community Support for Women - Case Management Services
 ArtHeart Community Art Centre
 Centre Communautaire Africains Francophones
 The Children's Book Bank Canada
 Parents For Better Beginnings
 Regent Park Community Health Centre
 Regent Park Community Centre
 Regent Park Bangladesh Community Association
 Regent Park Khaddim Committee
 Regent Park Women and Families
 Regent Park Focus Youth Media Arts Centre
 Regent Park Film Festival
 Regent Park Community Food Centre
 Regent Park Youth Council
 Regent Park African Women's Group
 The Salvation Army Corps 614
 South East Asian Services
 Toronto Council Fire Native Cultural Centre
 The Umar Bin Khattab Mosque
 W.A.T.C.H (Words, Action, Thought, Character and Heart) - UofT Community Service Club working to transform RP
 Toronto Christian Resource Center
 Regent Park Community Health Center
 Yonge Street Mission
 Dixon Hall
 South East Asian Service Center
 Lead2Peace

Toronto-related lists